Erimtan Archaeology and Arts Museum is an archaeology museum and music venue in Ankara, Turkey.

Location
It is between Museum of Anatolian Civilizations and Çengelhan Rahmi M. Koç Museum.

History
Erimtan Museum was established in 2015 by a private society named "Cultural Heritage Collectors’ Society", which was founded in 1996. The museum was named after the founder of the society Yüksel Erimtan, an engineer and an archaeology enthusiast, who endowed his private collection to the museum. The museum collection consists of nearly two thousand portable artifacts under the supervision of the Museum of Anatolian Civilizations. Almost all of the artifacts has Anatolian origin. The collection covers a period of time extending from three thousand BC to the Byzantine times.

Museum building
The museum is housed in three old Ankara buildings, which belong to the Ministry of Culture and Tourism. The society leased the buildings, and spent  10 million for the renovation of the buildings. There are also a conference room, a cafeteria and a bookstore in the museum building.

Tuesday concerts
Concerts are a part of museum activities. On Tuesdays, a concert is held in the museum building. Each season, about 16 concerts are held.

Gallery

References

Museums in Altındağ, Ankara
Archaeological museums in Turkey
Museums established in 2015
2015 establishments in Turkey
Music venues in Ankara
Altındağ, Ankara